Ivan Ivanovich Lavsky (August 23, 1919, city of Dnipropetrovsk, Ukraine Soviet Republic – October 10, 1977, Leningrad, USSR) was a Soviet realist painter and graphic artist, born in Ukraine who after World War II lived and worked in Leningrad. He was a member of the Leningrad Union of Artists and regarded as one of representatives of the Leningrad School of Painting.

Biography 
Ivan Ivanovich Lavsky was born August 15, 1919, in the industrial city of Dnipropetrovsk, Soviet Ukraine Republic.

In 1939 Ivan Lavsky graduated from Dnipropetrovsk Art School, where he studied under Mikhail Panin.

In 1941–1945, Ivan Lavsky took part in the Great Patriotic War, which led the Soviet people against Nazi Germany and its allies. As a machine gunner, he participated in the battles, was wounded and marked by military awards.

In 1946–1949 Ivan Lavsky attends Art Studio of the Leningrad House of Officers of Red Army, where his teachers were known artists Michail Avilov and Alfred Eberling.

Since 1947 Ivan Lavsky has participated in Art Exhibitions. He painted landscapes, genre scenes, cityscapes, sketches from the life.

Since 1956, Ivan Lavsky was a member of the Leningrad Union of Artists. In 1950–1970 years he made a creative journey in Old Ladoga, Goryachy Klyuch, Gurzuf, Monchegorsk, in Central Asia.

Most vividly picturesque talent of Ivan Lavsky opened in the genre of nature studies of small forms. In these works, made artistically, widely and easily, consistently surprising skill with which the artist with the challenge of painting – the transfer of the mood of the landscape and the main relations that determine its color.

Ivan Ivanovich Lavsky died on October 10, 1977 in Leningrad. His paintings reside in museums and private collections in Russia, Ukraine, France, England, the U.S., Italy, and others.

See also
 Leningrad School of Painting
 List of Russian artists
 List of 20th-century Russian painters
 List of painters of Saint Petersburg Union of Artists
 List of the Russian Landscape painters
 Saint Petersburg Union of Artists

References

Sources 
 The Spring Exhibition of works by Leningrad artists of 1954. Exhibition Catalogue. – Leningrad: Izogiz Edition, 1954. – p. 13.
 The Spring Exhibition of works by Leningrad artists of 1955. Catalogue. – Leningrad: Leningrad Union of Artists, 1956. – p. 12.
 The Spring Exhibition of works by Leningrad artists of 1956. Catalogue. – Leningrad: Leningrad Union of Artists, 1956.
 Autumn Exhibition of works by Leningrad artists of 1956. Exhibition Catalogue. – Leningrad: Leningrad Union of Artists Edition, 1958. – p. 53.
 1917 – 1957. Exhibition of works by Leningrad artists of 1957. Exhibition Catalogue. – Leningrad: Khudozhnik RSFSR, 1958. – p. 20.
 Autumn Exhibition of works by Leningrad artists of 1958. Exhibition Catalogue. – Leningrad: Khudozhnik RSFSR, 1959. – p. 16.
 Exhibition of works by Leningrad artists of 1960. Exhibition catalogue. – Leningrad: Khudozhnik RSFSR, 1963. – p. 12.
 Exhibition of works by Leningrad artists of 1960. Exhibition catalogue. – Leningrad: Khudozhnik RSFSR, 1961. – p. 24.
 Soviet Russia republic exhibition of 1960. Exhibition catalogue. – Moscow: Ministry of culture of Russian Federation, 1960. – p. 47.
 Exhibition of works by Leningrad artists of 1961. Exhibition catalogue. – Leningrad: Khudozhnik RSFSR, 1964. – p. 24.
 Autumn Exhibition of works by Leningrad artists of 1962. Exhibition Catalogue. – Leningrad: : Khudozhnik RSFSR, 1962. – p. 16.
 The Leningrad Fine Arts Exhibition. – Leningrad: Khudozhnik RSFSR, 1965. – p. 29.
 The Fall Exhibition of works by Leningrad artists of 1968. Catalogue. – Leningrad: Khudozhnik RSFSR, 1971. – p. 10.
 The Spring Exhibition of works by Leningrad artists of 1969. Catalogue. – Leningrad: Khudozhnik RSFSR, 1970. – p. 12.
 The Spring Exhibition of works by Leningrad artists of 1971. Catalogue. – Leningrad: Khudozhnik RSFSR, 1972. – p. 10.
 Exhibition of works by Leningrad artists dedicated to the 25th Anniversary of the Victory in Great Patriotic war. Catalogue. – Leningrad: Khudozhnik RSFSR, 1972. – pp. 7, 21.
 Art works by Russian Federation Artists grants to Museums and Culture Institutions (1963–1971). Official Catalogue. – Moscow: Russian Federation Union of Artists, 1972. – p. 57.
 Across the Motherland Exhibition of Leningrad artists. Catalogue. – Leningrad: Khudozhnik RSFSR, 1974. – p. 16.
 Exhibition of works by Leningrad artists dedicated to the 60th Anniversary of October Revolution. Catalogue. – Leningrad: Khudozhnik RSFSR, 1982. – p. 16.
 Exhibitions of Soviet art. Directory. Volume 5. 1954 – 1958. – Moscow: Soviet Artist, 1981. – pp. 25, 142, 259, 261, 386, 548.
 Directory of members of the Union of Artists of USSR. Volume 1. – Moscow: Soviet artist, 1979. – p. 606.
 Painting from the life, by Leningrad artists. Exhibition catalogue. – Saint Petersburg: Nikolai Nekrasov Memorial museum, 1994. – p. 4.
 The Lyrics in the works of artists of the war generation. Painting, drawings. Exhibition catalogue. – Saint Petersburg: Nikolai Nekrasov Memorial museum, 1995. – p. 4.
 Sergei V. Ivanov. Unknown Socialist Realism. The Leningrad School. – Saint Petersburg: NP-Print Edition, 2007. – pp. 18, 24, 29, 31, 318, 363, 390, 392–399, 404, 405, 414, 416–419, 422. , .

1919 births
1977 deaths
Soviet painters
Recipients of the Medal "For Courage" (Russia)
Soviet military personnel of World War II
Socialist realist artists
Leningrad School artists
Members of the Leningrad Union of Artists